The Toru River or Batang Toru is a river in northern Sumatra, Indonesia, about 1200 km northwest of the capital Jakarta.

Geography
The river flows in the northern area of Sumatra with predominantly tropical rainforest climate (designated as Af in the Köppen-Geiger climate classification). The annual average temperature in the area is 24 °C. The warmest month is February, when the average temperature is around 26 °C, and the coldest is May, at 22 °C. The average annual rainfall is 3379 mm. The wettest month is November, with an average of 520 mm rainfall, and the driest is July, with 156 mm rainfall. The area of the river is located on the Great Sumatran Fault Zone, providing the area with an abundance of geothermal energy sources and hot water springs, while also increasing the frequency of large earthquakes.

Ecology 
The river flows at the heart of the area where the Tapanuli orangutan lives, a kind of orangutan which was identified as a separate species in 2017.

Uses 
The Batang Toru hydropower project has started work on a dam and tunnel, financed by China, which is meant to provide electric power during 6 hours a day. As of 2022, Indonesian state-owned electronic distribution company Perusahaan Listrik Negara has also started to work with Indonesian private companies to establish a hydropower on the river.

See also
List of rivers of Indonesia
List of rivers of Sumatra

References

Rivers of North Sumatra
Rivers of Indonesia